McDonald Branch is a stream in Ray County in the U.S. state of Missouri. It is a tributary of the Crooked River.

McDonald Branch is named after Jeremiah McDonald, the original owner of the site.

See also
List of rivers of Missouri

References

Rivers of Ray County, Missouri
Rivers of Missouri